Zulch or Zülch is a surname. Notable people with the surname include:

 Billy Zulch (1886–1924), South African cricketer
 Tilman Zülch (born 1939), German activist

See also
 North Zulch, Texas
 Johan Zulch de Villiers (1845–1910), South African politician and attorney